The 1945 Sugar Bowl, part of the 1944 bowl game season, took place on January 1, 1945, at Tulane Stadium in New Orleans, Louisiana. The competing teams were the Alabama Crimson Tide, representing the Southeastern Conference (SEC) and the Duke Blue Devils, representing the Southern Conference (SoCon). Duke won the game 29–26.

Teams

Alabama

The 1942 Alabama squad finished the regular season 5–1–2 with its loss coming to the Georgia Bulldogs and the two ties coming against the LSU Tigers and the Tennessee Volunteers. With most of America's youth still serving in the armed forces, Frank Thomas scrambled to assemble a team in 1944.  Finally he was able to fill out a roster, mostly composed of 17-year-old freshmen and students who had been rejected as unsuitable for military service.  This team went down in Tide history as the "War Babies". On November 25, the Crimson Tide was invited to compete in the Sugar Bowl, marking the first time that a school had competed in the four major bowls at that time (Rose, Cotton, Orange and Sugar Bowls). The appearance marked the first for Alabama in the Sugar Bowl, and their eighth overall bowl appearance.

Duke

Game summary

References

Sugar Bowl
Sugar Bowl
Alabama Crimson Tide football bowl games
Duke Blue Devils football bowl games
Sugar Bowl
Sugar Bowl